Dolerocypris is a genus of ostracods belonging to the family Cyprididae.

The species of this genus are found in Europe and Northern America.

Species:
 Dolerocypris fasciata (Müller, 1776)
 Dolerocypris ikeyai Smith & Kamiya, 2006

References

Podocopida
Podocopida genera